Harry McCoy (December 10, 1893 – September 1, 1937) was an American film actor and screenwriter.  He appeared in more than 150 films between 1912 and 1935.

Early years
McCoy was born on December 10, 1893, in Philadelphia, Pennsylvania, the firstborn of George Washington McCoy and Alberta Keel. His family moved to California in 1910. His had a sister, Alberta.

Career 
McCoy's early experience in entertainment was in vaudeville, where he played a piano and sang.

He joined Universal's Joker Comedy brand in 1912, and the following year teamed with Max Asher to form Mike and Jake for Joker. In 1913, he worked at Universal and Keystone at the same time and was one of the original Keystone Cops. At Triangle Keystone, McCoy directed 15 films. He stayed with the post-Sennett Keystone until August 1917, then made a brief return to vaudeville with the Pantages circuit. In 1920, He played opposite Sid Smith as one of CBC/Federated's "Hall-room Boys" before being replaced by Jimmy Adams. 

He appeared in the Stern Bros. Century Comedies for Universal from 1924 to 1925, but he soon became Mack Sennett's writer.  

He sued Sennett over some music he wrote in 1930, but the dispute apparently was settled before it came to court. In the mid-1930s, he played piano at Frank Kerwin's Merry-Go-Round nightclub.  

McCoy joined Disney studio just months before his death.

Personal life and death 
McCoy married Frances Josephine Anton in 1923 but the marriage did not go well. After a divorce, he married Mercedes Williams in 1927.  He died on September 1, 1937, in Hollywood, California, from a heart attack.

Selected filmography

 He Would a Hunting Go (1913)
 Fatty and Minnie He-Haw (1914)
 Fatty's Magic Pants (1914)
 Getting Acquainted (1914)
 His New Profession (1914)
 The Masquerader (1914)
 The Face on the Bar Room Floor (1914)
 The Property Man (1914)
 Mabel's Married Life (1914)
 Mabel's Busy Day (1914)
 Mabel's Blunder (1914)
 Caught in a Cabaret (1914)
 Mabel at the Wheel (1914)
 Mabel's Strange Predicament (1914)
 In the Clutches of the Gang (1914)
 Tillie's Punctured Romance (1914)
 Mabel and Fatty's Wash Day (1915)
 Fatty's Reckless Fling (1915)
 Fatty's Chance Acquaintance (1915)
 That Little Band of Gold (1915)
 A Village Scandal (1915)
 A Hoosier Romance (1918)
 Fair Enough (1918)
 The Garage (1920)
 Skirts (1921)
 The Fatal Mistake (1924)
 Heir-Loons (1925)
 Heads Up (1925)
 Stick Around (1925)
 The Girl from Everywhere (1927)
 Hearts of Men (1928)
 A Little Bit of Fluff (1928)
 Midnight Daddies (1930)
 One More Chance (1931) (writer)
 Won by a Neck (1930)

References

External links

1893 births
1937 deaths
American male film actors
American male silent film actors
American male screenwriters
Male actors from Philadelphia
Male actors from Hollywood, Los Angeles
20th-century American male actors
Screenwriters from Pennsylvania
Screenwriters from California
20th-century American male writers
20th-century American screenwriters
Vaudeville performers